American actress Lauren Bacall (1924–2014) had an extensive career in films, television shows, and plays. She was one of the leading ladies during the Golden Age of Hollywood along with actresses such as Marilyn Monroe and Rita Hayworth. Bacall started her career as a teenage fashion model when she appeared on the cover of Harper's Bazaar and was discovered by Howard Hawks' wife Nancy. As she naturally had a high-pitched and nasal voice, she received lessons to help deepen it and was required to shout verses by Shakespeare for hours every day as part of her training.

Bacall's first film appearance was with Humphrey Bogart in the 1944 film To Have and Have Not. The following year she married Bogart and went on to appear with him in The Big Sleep (1946), Dark Passage (1947), and Key Largo (1948). She also starred in comedies such as How to Marry a Millionaire in 1953 with Marilyn Monroe, Designing Woman in 1957 with Gregory Peck, and Sex and the Single Girl in 1964 with Natalie Wood. Bacall also appeared in Murder on the Orient Express (1974) and The Shootist (1976).

In Bacall's later years, she appeared in the films All I Want for Christmas (1991), Prêt-à-Porter (1994), The Mirror Has Two Faces (1996), My Fellow Americans (1996), Diamonds (1999), Dogville (2003), Eve (2008) Wide Blue Yonder (2010) and The Forger (2012). For her role as Hannah Morgan in The Mirror Has Two Faces, Bacall won the Golden Globe Award for Best Supporting Actress – Motion Picture and was nominated for a BAFTA and an Academy Award. Her television work included appearances on Mr. Broadway (1964), Chicago Hope (1998), and The Rockford Files (1979), as well as providing the voice of Evelyn on the animated series Family Guy (2014).

Bacall also performed on Broadway in the plays Cactus Flower in 1965 and The Visit in 1995 and musicals such as Applause in 1970 and Woman of the Year in 1981. For her roles in Applause and Woman of the Year, she won the Tony Award for Best Actress in a Musical.

Filmography

Television

Theatre

Radio
Lux Radio Theatre (1946) - Episode: To Have and Have Not
 Bold Venture (1951–1952) - 78 episodes

See also
List of awards and nominations received by Lauren Bacall
Humphrey Bogart on stage, screen, radio and television

References

External links
 
 

Actress filmographies
American filmographies